
Year 558 (DLVIII) was a common year starting on Tuesday (link will display the full calendar) of the Julian calendar. The denomination 558 for this year has been used since the early medieval period, when the Anno Domini calendar era became the prevalent method in Europe for naming years.

Events 
 By place 

 Byzantine Empire 
 May 7 – In Constantinople, the dome of the Hagia Sophia collapses due to an earthquake. Emperor Justinian I orders the dome to be rebuilt.

 Europe 
 The Avars and the Slavs occupy the Hungarian Plain on the Balkans. The threat of Avar domination prompts the Lombards to migrate to Italy.  
 December 13 – King Chlothar I reunites the Frankish Kingdom after his brother Childebert I dies, becoming sole ruler of the Franks.
 December 23 – Chlothar I is crowned King of the Franks.
 Conall mac Comgaill becomes king of Dál Riata, a Gaelic overkingdom on the western coast of Scotland.

 Asia 
 Istämi, ruler of the Western Turkic Khaganate, establishes diplomatic relations with the Byzantine Empire.

 By topic 

 Religion 
 December 23 – The Abbey of Saint-Germain-des-Prés is dedicated by Germain, bishop of Paris.
 The Bangor Abbey is founded by the Irish abbot Comgall in Northern Ireland (approximate date).

Births 
 Gao Yan, prince of Northern Qi (d. 571)
 Yu Shinan, calligrapher and official (d. 638)

Deaths 
 May 1 – Marcouf, missionary and saint
 May 13 – John the Silent, bishop and saint
 May 15 – Hilary of Galeata, Christian monk
 December 13 – Childebert I, king of the Franks
 Abraham of Kratia, Christian monk (approximate date)
 Empress Dugu, Northern Zhou consort
 Gabrán mac Domangairt, king of Dál Riata
 Jing Di, emperor of the Liang Dynasty (b. 543)

References